Moloch (Mōleḵ or הַמֹּלֶךְ‎ hamMōleḵ; , ; also Molech or Molek) is a name or a term which appears in the Hebrew Bible several times, primarily in the book of Leviticus. The Bible strongly condemns practices which are associated with Moloch, practices which appear to have included child sacrifice.

Traditionally, the name Moloch has been understood as referring to a Canaanite god. However, since 1935, scholars have debated whether or not the term refers to a type of sacrifice on the basis of a similar term, also spelled mlk, which means "sacrifice" in the Punic language. This second position has grown increasingly popular, but it remains contested. Among proponents of this second position, controversy continues as to whether the sacrifices were offered to Yahweh or another deity, and whether they were a native Israelite religious custom or a Phoenician import.

Since the medieval period, Moloch has often been portrayed as a bull-headed idol with outstretched hands over a fire; this depiction takes the brief mentions of Moloch in the Bible and combines them with various sources, including ancient accounts of Carthaginian child sacrifice and the legend of the Minotaur.

"Moloch" has been figuratively used in reference to a person or a thing which demands or requires a very costly sacrifice. A god Moloch appears in various works of literature and film, such as John Milton's Paradise Lost (1667), Gustave Flaubert's Salammbô (1862), Fritz Lang's Metropolis (1927 film), and Allen Ginsberg's "Howl" (1955).

Etymology
"Moloch" derives from a Latin transcription of the Greek Μόλοχ Mólokh, itself a transcription of the original  Mōleḵ.

The etymology of Moloch is uncertain: most scholars derive it from the root  "to rule" but with the vowels of  "shame" (first advanced by Abraham Geiger in 1857), much like Ashtoreth, or as a qal participle from the same verb. R. M. Kerr criticizes both theories by noting that — Ashtoreth notwithstanding – the name of no other god appears to have been formed from a qal participle, and that Geiger's proposal is "an out-of-date theory which has never received any factual support".

Scholars who do not believe that Moloch represents a deity instead compare the name to inscriptions in the closely-related Punic language where the word  (molk or mulk) refers to a type of sacrifice, a connection first proposed by Otto Eissfeldt (1935). Eissfeldt himself, following Jean-Baptiste Chabot, connected Punic  and Moloch to a Syriac verb  meaning "to promise", a theory also supported as "the least problematic solution" by Heath Dewrell (2017). Scholars such as W. von Soden argue that the term is a nominalized causative form of the verb , meaning "to offer", "present", and thus means "the act of presenting" or "thing presented". Kerr instead derives both the Punic and Hebrew word from the verb , which he proposes meant "to own", "to possess" in Proto-Semitic, only later coming to mean "to rule"; the meaning of Moloch would thus originally have been "present", "gift", and later come to mean "sacrifice".

Biblical attestations

Masoretic text
The word Moloch occurs 8 times in the Masoretic text of the Hebrew Bible; in one of these instances (1 Kings 11:7) it is probably a mistake for Milcom, the god of the Ammonites. Five of the others are in Leviticus, with one in 2 Kings and another in The Book of Jeremiah. Each mention of Moloch indicates the presence of the article , or "the", therefore reading "the Moloch". A  is, however, present in 1 Kings 11:7, although this may be explained by the apparently erroneous substitution of Moloch for Milkom detailed above.

All of these texts condemn Israelites who engage in practices associated with Moloch, and most associate Moloch with the use of children as offerings. The activity of causing children "to pass over the fire" is mentioned, without reference to Moloch, in numerous other verses of the bible, such as in Deuteronomy (Deuteronomy 12:31, 18:10), 2 Kings (2 Kings 16:3; 17:17; 17:31; 21:6), 2 Chronicles (2 Chronicles 28:3; 33:6), the Book of Jeremiah (Jeremiah 7:31, 19:5) and the Book of Ezekiel (Ezekiel 16:21; 20:26, 31; 23:37).

Leviticus repeatedly forbids the practice of offering children to Moloch:

The majority of the Leviticus references come from a single passage of four lines:

In 2 Kings, Moloch is associated with the tophet in the valley of Gehenna when it is destroyed by king Josiah:

Lastly, the prophet Jeremiah condemns practices associated with Moloch as showing infidelity to Yahweh:

Given the name's similarity to the Hebrew word  "king", scholars have also searched the Masoretic text to find instances of  that may be mistakes for Moloch. Most scholars consider only one instance as likely a mistake, in Isaiah:

Septuagint and New Testament
The Greek Septuagint translates the instances of Moloch in Leviticus as "ruler", and as "king" at 1 Kings 11:7. It contains Moloch at 2 Kings 23:10 and Jeremiah 30:35. Additionally, the Septuagint uses the name Moloch in Amos where it is not found in the Masoretic text:

The Greek version with Moloch is quoted in the New Testament and accounts for the one occurrence of Moloch there (Acts 7:43).

Theories

Moloch as a deity
Before 1935, all scholars held that Moloch was a pagan deity, to whom child sacrifice was offered at the Jerusalem tophet. The medieval rabbinical tradition understood Moloch as closely related to other similarly named deities mentioned in the bible such as Milcom, Adrammelek, and Anammelech. The medieval rabbinical tradition also connected Moloch to reports of ancient Phoenician and Carthaginian child sacrifice; both of these rabbinical ideas were taken over by early modern scholarship. Some modern scholars have proposed that Moloch may be the same god as Milcom, Adad-Milki, or an epithet for Baal.

G. C. Heider and John Day connect Moloch with a deity Mlk attested at Ugarit and Malik attested in Mesopotamia and proposes that he was a god of the underworld, as in Mesopotamia Malik is twice equated with the underworld god Nergal. Day also notes that Isaiah seems to associate Moloch with Sheol. The Ugaritic deity Mlk also appears to be associated with the underworld, and the similarly named Phoenician god Melqart (literally "king of the city") could have underworld associations if "city" is understood to mean "underworld", as proposed by William F. Albright. Heider also argued that there was also an Akkadian term  referring to the shades of the dead.

The notion that Moloch refers to a deity has been challenged for several reasons. Moloch is rarely mentioned in the Bible, is not mentioned at all outside of it, and connections to other deities with similar names are uncertain. Moreover, it is possible that some of the supposed deities named Mlk are epithets for another god, given that mlk can also mean "king". The Israelite rite conforms, on the other hand, to the Punic  rite in that both involved the sacrifice of children. None of the proposed gods Moloch could be identified with is associated with human sacrifice, the god Mlk of Ugarit appears to have only received animal sacrifice, and the  sacrifice is never offered to a god name Mlk but rather to another deity.

Moloch as a form of sacrifice
In 1935, Otto Eissfeldt proposed, on the basis of Punic inscriptions, that Moloch was a form of sacrifice rather than a deity. The Biblical term  would thus be translated not as "to Moloch", as normally translated, but as "as a molk-sacrifice", a meaning consistent with uses of the Hebrew preposition  elsewhere. Bennie Reynolds further argues that Jeremiah's use of Moloch in conjunction with Baal in Jer 32:25 is parallel to his use of "burnt offering" and Baal in Jeremiah 19:4–5.

The view that Moloch refers to a type of sacrifice was challenged by John Day and George Heider in the 1980s. Day and Heider argued that it was unlikely that biblical commentators had misunderstood an earlier term for a sacrifice as a deity and that Leviticus 20:5's mention of "whoring after Moloch" necessarily implied that Moloch was a god. Day and Heider nevertheless accepted that mlk was a sacrificial term in Punic, but argue that it did not originate in Phoenicia and that it was not brought back to Phoenicia by the Punic diaspora. More recently, Anthony Frendo argues that the Hebrew equivalent to Punic  (the root of Punic ) is the verb  "to pass over"; in Frendo's view, this means that Hebrew Moloch is not derived from the same root as Punic .

Since Day's and Heider's objections, a growing number of scholars has come to believe that Moloch refers to the mulk sacrifice rather than a deity. Francesca Stavrakopoulou argues that "because both Heider and Day accept Eissfeldt's interpretation of Phoenician-Punic  as a  sacrificial term, their  positions are at once compromised by the possibility that biblical  could well function in a similar way as a technical term for a type of sacrifice". She further argues that "whoring after Moloch" does not need to imply a deity as  refers to both the act of sacrificing and the thing sacrificed, allowing an interpretation of "whor[ing]  after  the mlk-offering". Heath Dewrell argues that the translation of Leviticus 20:5 in the Septuagint, which substitutes ἄρχοντας "princes" for Moloch, implies that the biblical urtext did not include the phrase "whoring after Moloch". Bennie Reynolds further notes that at least one inscription from Tyre does appear to mention  sacrifice (RES 367); therefore Day and Heider are incorrect that the practice is unattested in Canaan (Phoenicia). Reynolds also argues for further parallels.

Among scholars who deny the existence of a deity Moloch, debate remains as to whether the Israelite mlk sacrifices were offered to Yahweh or another deity. Armin Lange suggests that the Binding of Isaac represents a mlk-sacrifice to Yahweh in which the child is finally substituted with a sheep, noting that Isaac was meant to be a burnt offering. This opinion is shared by Stavrakopoulou, who also points to the sacrifice of Jephthah of his daughter as a burnt offering. Frendo, while he argues that Moloch refers to a god, accepts Stavrakopoulou's argument that the sacrifices in the tophet were originally to Yahweh. Dewrell argues that although  sacrifices were offered to Yahweh, they were distinct from other forms of human or child sacrifice found in the Bible (such as that of Jephthah) and were a foreign custom imported by the Israelites from the Phoenicians during the reign of Ahaz.

As a rite of passage
A minority of scholars, mainly scholars of Punic studies, has argued that the ceremonies to Moloch are in fact a non-lethal dedication ceremony rather than a sacrifice. These theories are partially supported by commentary in the Talmud and among early Jewish commentators of the Bible. Rejecting such arguments, Paolo Xella and Francesca Stavrakopoulou note that the Bible explicitly connects the ritual to Moloch at the tophet with the verbs indicating slaughter, killing in sacrifice, deities "eating" the children, and holocaust. Xella also refers to Carthaginian and Phoenician child sacrifice found referenced in Greco-Roman sources.

Moloch in art and culture

Medieval and modern artistic depictions
Medieval and modern sources tend to portray Moloch as a bull-headed humanoid idol with arms outstretched over a fire, onto which the sacrificial child is placed. This portrayal can be traced back to medieval Jewish commentaries, which connected the biblical Moloch with depictions of Carthaginian sacrifice to Cronus (Baal Hammon) found in sources such as Diodorus, with George Foote Moore suggesting that the bull's head may derive from the mythological Minotaur. John S. Rundin suggests that further sources for the image are the legend of Talos and the brazen bull built for king Phalaris of the Greek city of Acragas on Sicily. He notes that both legends, as well as that of the Minotaur, have potential associations with Semitic child sacrifice.

In literature

Milton's Paradise Lost
In John Milton's Paradise Lost (1667), Moloch is one of the greatest warriors of the fallen angels,

He is listed among the chief of Satan's angels in Book I, and is given a speech at the parliament of Hell in Book 2:43–105, where he argues for immediate warfare against God. He later becomes revered as a pagan god on Earth.

Flaubert's Salammbô

Gustave Flaubert's Salammbô, a historical novel about Carthage published in 1862, included a version of the Carthaginian religion, including the god Moloch, whom he characterized as a god to whom the Carthaginians offered children. Flaubert described this Moloch mostly according to the Rabbinic descriptions, but with a few of his own additions. From chapter 7:

Chapter 13 describes how, in desperate attempt to call down rain, the image of Moloch was brought to the center of Carthage, how the arms of the image were moved by the pulling of chains by the priests (apparently Flaubert's own invention), and then describes the sacrifices made to Moloch. First grain and animals of various kinds were placed in compartments within the statue (as in the Rabbinic account). Then the children were offered, at first a few, and then more and more.

Karel  Čapek's War with the Newts
 In Karel Čapek's War with the Newts (1936), the Newts counter Christian attempts at conversion by turning to a god of their own creation named Moloch:

Allen Ginsberg's "Howl"
In Allen Ginsberg's poem "Howl" (1955), Moloch is used as a metaphor for industrial civilization and for America more specifically. The word is repeated many times throughout Part II of the poem, and begins (as an exclamation of "Moloch!") all but the first and last five stanzas of the section.

As social or political allegory
Moloch is sometimes used to indicate something that demands immense sacrifice and subservience.

Karl Marx referred to money as a Moloch in Capital and in Grundrisse.
Anti-abortion advocates B. G. Jefferis and J. L. Nichols used the child sacrifice to Moloch as a metaphor for abortion in an 1894 publication.
In Bertrand Russell's A Free Man's Worship (1903), Moloch is used to describe a particularly savage brand of religion:
During the growth of vehicle ownership in the United States, the concern for automobile deaths prompted at least one editorial cartoonist to label the automobile "the Modern Moloch", viewing the car as a machine of death.
In letters of the Munich Cosmic Circle the name Moloch was used to symbolize a Jewish God, hostile to life.
In The Gathering Storm (1948), the first volume of Winston Churchill's history of World War II, Churchill describes Adolf Hitler's triumph at the moment he finally achieved total power in 1933:
Garry Wills' article "Our Moloch" (2012) in The New York Review of Books used Moloch as a metaphor for guns, to which "we sacrifice children".

In film 

 The 1914 Italian epic Cabiria, Roman heroes Croessa, Fulvius, and Maciste sneak into the temple of Moloch and boldly save the titular Cabiria from sacrifice. Their escape plays out across the gigantic statue of Moloch.
 In Fritz Lang's 1927 silent film Metropolis, the industrial machinery of the factory is envisioned as a sacrificial temple to Moloch.
 The 1963 Italian film Hercules vs. Moloch pits the mythological hero against the evil worshipers of Moloch.
In Tabletop Wargaming:

 In Mantic Games tabletop wargame "Kings of War", a Forces of the Abyss Unit Type is called "Moloch".

See also

 Idolatry
 Lamia

References
Informational notes

Citations

Sources

External links 

 HelgaSeeden, "A tophet in Tyre?" 1991. from Bertyus 39 (American University of Beirut).

Book of Leviticus
Child sacrifice
Deities in the Hebrew Bible
Evil gods
Horned deities
Mythological bulls
Phoenician mythology
West Semitic gods
Gehenna
Cattle deities